Flying disc was introduced as a World Games sport at the 2001 World Games in Akita. Disc golf was discontinued after only one competition in 2001.

Ultimate is the only current event.

Ultimate

From 2001 to 2017, the Ultimate tournament featured just six teams, the top five countries from the previous years World Ultimate Championships of all three divisions: men's, women's and mixed and the host country. In 2022 the tournament was expanded to eight teams.

From 2001 to 2009 the tournament was played with six players per side, with three women and three men on the field from each team.  In 2013, the tournament was played with the regulatory seven players per side, three men four women or four women, three men.

Cumulative results
The following is a compiled national level championship table for ultimate at the World Games.

Disc golf

Men

Women

External links
 World Games at Sports123 by Internet Archive
2005 World Games info system

Sports at the World Games
Flying disc tournaments